Rosaura Revueltas Sánchez (August 6, 1910 – April 30, 1996) was a Mexican actress of screen and stage, and a dancer, author and teacher.

Early life
Rosaura Revueltas was born in Lerdo, Durango, Mexico to the famously artistic Revueltas family and had three brothers who all were artists: Silvestre Revueltas who was a composer, Jose Revueltas a writer and Fermín Revueltas a painter.

Like her brothers, she chose a profession in the arts. She studied acting and ballet in Mexico City and had a successful film career in Mexico before she worked on her trademark film Salt of the Earth in the United States. For the period that Revueltas was actively working in film, her career was primarily based on creating progressive representations of women. Before she worked on the 1954 film Salt of the Earth, Revueltas worked on the 1951 Muchachas de Uniforme, the Mexican remake of the 1931 German film Mädchen in Uniform. The film was one of the first visual documentations of a lesbian romance. Revueltas' decisions to act in politically progressive films sometimes led to her being targeted by politicians and Catholic Church officials. After the release of Muchachas de Uniforme, the Catholic Church encouraged a boycott of the film. After Rosaura Revueltas’ involvement in this film she immigrated to the U.S and continued her revolutionary work in Salt of the Earth, released in 1954.

Film career
Revueltas' first film was La Deconocida de Arras (1946). In 1951 she played Rosa Suárez, viuda de Ortiz (the widow of Ortiz) in the film Islas Marías, starring Pedro Infante.

In 1953's Sombrero, Revueltas played Tía Magdalena. Bosley Crowther of the New York Times called it "a big, broad-brimmed, squashy sort of picture, as massive as the garment for which it is named". The movie for which she is best-known is Herbert J. Biberman's Salt of the Earth (1954). The movie was based on the 1951 Empire Zinc strike in Grant County, New Mexico. She played the role of Esperanza Quintero, the wife of a mine worker. Crowther called her "lean and dynamic" in this role. In this film, Esperanza's husband and fellow miners decide to go on strike, and in turn their wives do the same in order to support their spouses and gain rights of their own.

Revueltas was not Biberman's first choice for the role of Esperanza. Originally his wife Gale Sondergaard was cast, but Biberman thought the role should be portrayed by a Spanish-speaking actress.
Revueltas was one of the few established actors in that film; most of the other roles, including that of her husband Ramon, were played by actual miners, some of whom had taken part in the real-life strikes. Juan Chacón, who played Ramon Quintero, was the president of an actual local miners' union.

Blacklistees
Herbert J. Biberman was part of the Hollywood Ten blacklistees, and the successful film career of his wife, Gale Sondergaard, ended. Michael Wilson, the film writer, and Paul Jarrico, the producer, were also blacklisted. The Hollywood ten was a group of men who were blacklisted for allegedly/potentially being Communists, and who, because of this labeling, were unable to find work in Hollywood for many years. Revueltas suffered the wrath of the Red Scare. During the filming of Salt of the Earth Revueltas was arrested by immigration officials on an alleged passport violation and was forced to return to Mexico. After that exile she was labeled a Communist. The rest of Salt of the Earth had to be filmed using a double for Revueltas. She never worked on an American film again. Revueltas once said that "[s]ince [the INS] had no evidence to present of my 'subversive' character, I can only conclude that I was 'dangerous' because I had been playing a role that gave status and dignity to the character of a Mexican-American woman." 

In Crowther's New York Times review of Salt of the Earth, he says, "Salt of the Earth is, in substance, simply a strong pro-labor film with a particularly sympathetic interest in the Mexican-Americans with whom it deals. True, it frankly implies that the mine operators have taken advantage of the Mexican-born or descended laborers, have forced a "speed up" in their mining techniques and given them less respectable homes than provided the so-called 'Anglo' laborers. It slaps at brutal police tactics in dealing with strikers and it gets in some rough, sarcastic digs at the attitude of 'the bosses' and the working of the Taft–Hartley Law."

Salt of the Earth was the only movie to ever be blacklisted during the "Communist Scare" of the 1950s (a.k.a. McCarthyism). It was selected however for the National Film Registry in 1992, thirty-eight years after its original release. In 1956, at the Académie du cinéma de Paris, Revueltas received the Best Actress award for her performance.

After Salt of the Earth
Revueltas moved to East Germany in 1957 and lived there until 1960. While in East Germany, Revueltas worked with the Berliner Ensemble--the company of the late playwright Bertolt Brecht--and in Cuba. In her later years, she served as a judge in film festivals including the 36th Berlin International Film Festival in 1986. Revueltas moved back to Mexico in 1960, where she began taking acting classes and also began to write plays. It was not until 1976 that Revueltas made another film. Her first film since she was blacklisted was Mina, viento de libertad (Mina, Wind of Freedom). In that same year she also played Tía Licha in Lo Mejor de Teresa (The Best of Teresa). Her final film was made in 1977, entitled Balun Canan. She also taught yoga in Mexico. In 1979 she published a book, Los Revueltas: Biografía de una familia (The Revueltas: Biography of a Family).

Death
She died on April 20, 1996, six months after having been diagnosed with lung cancer, in Cuernavaca, Mexico, at the age of 85. She had one child, a son, Arturo Bodenstedt.

Awards
Rosaura Revueltas was awarded the Best Actress Award for her performance in Salt of the Earth by the Académie du cinéma de Paris in 1956.

Legacy
In 2000, the film One of the Hollywood Ten was made, written and directed by Karl Francis. The film focuses on Herbert Biberman's having been blacklisted. It also includes a segment on the film Salt of the Earth, in which Revueltas was portrayed by actress Ángela Molina.

Selected filmography

The Torch, a.k.a. Bandit General (1949), a.k.a. Del Odio Nace el Amor (1951)
El cuarto mandamiento (1948)
Muchachas de Uniforme, a.k.a. Girls in Uniform (1950)
Un Día de Vida (1950)
Vuelve Pancho Villa, a.k.a. Pancho Villa Returns (1950)
Un día de vida (1951)
Islas Marías (1951)
 Girls in Uniform (1951)
El Cuarto Cerrado  (1952)
El rebozo de Soledad (1952)
Sombrero (1953)
Salt of the Earth (1954)
Mina, Viento de Libertad, a.k.a. Mina, Wind of Freedom (1976)
Lo Mejor de Teresa (1976)
Balún Canán (1976)

References

Further reading
 Crowther, Bosley. 'Sombrero' Skims into Loew's State and a Resolute Cast is Obscured by the Shade, New York Times, April 23, 1953
 'Salt of the Earth' opens at the Grande - Filming Marked by Violence, New York Times, March 15, 1954
 Lorence, James J. The Suppression of 'Salt of the Earth'. How Hollywood, Big Labor, and Politicians Blacklisted a Movie in Cold War America, University of New Mexico Press: 1999 ( - cloth version/ - paper version)
50 años de Danza, Palacio de Bellas Artes.  Vol. I y II.  México: 	INBA/SEP, 1985. 

50 años de Ópera, Palacio de Bellas Artes.  México: INBA/SEP, 1986. 

50 años de Teatro, Palacio de Bellas Artes.  México: INBA/SEP, 1986. 

Azar, Héctor.  Funciones Teatrales.  México: SEP/CADAC, 1982.  

Bake’s Biografical Dictionary of Musicians.  8a. Ed.  Revisada por Nicolás 	Slonimsky. New York: Schirmer Books, 1992.

Careaga, Gabriel.  Sociedad y Teatro Moderno en México.  México: Contrapuntos, 1994. 

Ceballos, Edgar.  Diccionario Enciclopédico Básico de Teatro Mexicano. 	Col. Escenología.  México: Siglo XX, 1996. 

---. Las Técnicas de Actuación en México.  Colección Escenología. México: Gaceta, 1993. 

Encyclopaedia Britannica de México.  Lexipedia Barsa.  Tomo II.  México: 1984. 

Enciclopedia de México. Dir. José Rogelio Álvarez.  Tomo  1, 7, 8, 9, 10,  	y 13.  México:  S.E.P./Enciclopedia de México, 1987.  

García Riera, E., Macotela, F.  La Guia del Cine Mexicano.  1919-1984.  México: Patria, 1985

García Riera, Emilio.  Historia Documental del Cine Mexicano.  Tomo IV 	(1949-1951).  México: Era, 1972. 

---.  Historia Documental del Cine Mexicano. Tomo V (1952-1954).  	Tomo VII (1955-1957).  México: Era, 1973. 

---.  Historia Documental del Cine Mexicano.  Tomo 4 (1946-1948).  	Tomo 5 (1949-1950).  Tomo 6 (1951-1952).  Tomo 7 (1953-1954).  	México: Universidad de Guadalajara et. al., 1993. 

---.  Historia Documental del Cine Mexicano.  Tomo 17 (1974-1976). 	México: Universidad de Guadalajara et. al., 1995.  

Garraty, John A.  The nature of biography.  New York: Alfred A. Knopf, 	1957.

Gorostiza, Celestino.  Teatro mexicano del S. XX.  México: FCE, 1956.  

Hernández Camargo, Emiliano.  Durangueñeidad, el orgullo de lo 	nuestro.  Durango: Dirección General de Culturas Populares Unidad 	Regional Norte La Laguna, 1997. 

Hernández, Ignacio.  Prólogo en Revueltas, José.  El cuadrante de la 	soledad (y otras obras de teatro).  No. 21.  Andrea Revueltas y 	Philippe Cheron recop. y notas.  México: Era, 1984.

Hernández Sampieri, et. al.  Metodología de la Investigación.  Colombia: McGraw Hill, 1991. 

Johnson, Rodrigo ed.  Brecht en México a cien años de su nacimiento  México:  U.N.A.M./La Compañía Perpetua/ I.N.B.A., C.I.T.R.U., 	1998. 

Kschemisvara; Hsing-Tao, Li.  La ira de caúsica y El círculo de tiza  Buenos Aires: Espasa-Calpe, 1941.  

Leyva, José Angél.  El Naranjo en Flor (Homenaje a los Revueltas).  Juan Pablos y el Instituto Municipal del Arte y la Cultura eds.  2a. Ed.  	México: Sin Nombre, 1999. 

Lozoya Cigarroa, Manuel.  Historia Mínima de Durango.  Durango: Ed. Durango, 1995.

---.  Hombre y Mujeres de Durango.  2a. Ed.  Durango: Comisión de Estudios Históricos e Investigaciones Sociales del Estado de 	Durango-PRI, 1985. 

Magaña Esquivel, Antonio, y Ruth S. Lamb.  Breve Historia del Teatro Mexicano.  México: Andrea, 1958. 

Magaña Esquivel, Antonio.  Medio Siglo de Teatro Mexicano 	[1900-1961]. México: Instituto Nacional de Bellas Artes, 1964. 

---.  Teatro Mexicano del Siglo XX.  Vol. II.  México: FCE, 1986.

May, Georges.  La autobiografía.  Trad. Danubio Torres Fierro.  México: Fondo de Cultura Económica, 1982.

Murray Kendall, Paul.  The art of biography.  New York: Norton & Co., 	1965.

de Olavarria y Ferrari, Enrique.  Reseña Histórica del Teatro en México  	Tomo V.  3a. Ed.  México: Porrúa, 1961.

Pâris, Alain.  Diccionario de Intérpretes.  Trad.  Juan Sainz de los Terreros.  Madrid:  Turner Música, 1985.  

Revueltas, José.  Cuestionamientos e intenciones  No. 18.  2a. Ed.  Andrea Revueltas y Philippe Cheron recop. y notas.  México: Era, 	1981. 

---.  El cuadrante de la soledad (y otras obras de teatro).  No. 21.  Andrea Revueltas y Philippe Cheron recop. y notas.  México: Era, 	1984.

---.  El cuadrante de la soledad.  México: Novaro, 1971. 

---.  Las Evocaciones Requeridas.  Vol. I y II.  Andrea Revueltas y Philippe Cheron recop. y notas.  México: Era, 1987. 

Revueltas, Rosaura.  Los Revueltas.  México: Grijalbo, 1979. 

---.  Silvestre Revueltas por él mismo.  México: Era, 1989. 

Testimonios para la Historia del Cine Mexicano.  IV.  Cuadernos de la Cineteca Nacional.  Dir. General de Cinematografía et. al.  México: 	Secretaría de Gobierno, 1976. 

Völker, Klaus.  Brecht: a Biography.  Trad. John Norwell.  New York: Seabury Press, 1978.

External links

1910 births
1996 deaths
Actresses from Durango
Hollywood blacklist
Deaths from lung cancer
Mexican film actresses
Deaths from cancer in Mexico
People deported from the United States
20th-century Mexican actresses